Avesta is a locality and the seat of Avesta Municipality in Dalarna County, Sweden, with 11,949 inhabitants in 2015.

The name is first found in 1303 as "Aghastadhum". Aghe is of similar origin as the word å, meaning stream, in this case the Avestafors, a tributary of the river Dalälven. Stadhum was dative plural of a word of similar origin as stead, or farm.

History 
In the Scandinavian Middle Ages there was a blast furnace at the location. In 1636 the construction of a giant copper mine was initiated near the Avesta fors.

The town Avesta received partial privileges in 1641 as a town under the city of Falun, and in 1644 a copper mint was built. However, the privileges were withdrawn in 1688 due to complaints of competition from its neighbour, mainly Falun. Copper coins were continued to be minted until 1831, and the copper works was in function until 1869.

Full city rights were regranted in 1919. The designated coat of arms depict the signs for copper and iron.

Geography 
The town is located by the Dalecarlia River (Dalälven).

The railway junction Krylbo is situated in Avesta.

Climate 
Precipitation is quite high by standards of Sweden's areas closer to the Baltic Sea, which renders the possibility of heavy snowfall in winter.

Sightseeing
The city of Avesta has the world's largest Dalecarlian horse. The horse statue is made of concrete and located next to the city's first Burger King. Avesta's Burger King opened on February 16, 2016.

Koppardalen Verket is a popular attraction in Avesta. It is a former ironworks that began operations in 1874. It is now a museum and hosts art exhibits.

Metropoolen is an indoor swimming pool and adventure area in Avesta. It includes a 78-meter-long water slide. 

Avesta Visentpark (Avesta Bison Park) has about 25 European bison. The park has a cafe, a historic home from the 1930s, and a children's playhouse.

Notable people
 Retired NHL defenceman Nicklas Lidström
 Swedish footballer Lina Hurtig
 Tony Rickardsson
 Counter-Strike: Global Offensive player Jesper 'JW' Wecksell

Bands
Scar Symmetry

References 

Swedish municipal seats
Populated places in Dalarna County
Populated places in Avesta Municipality
Municipal seats of Dalarna County